Time of a Dancer, also translated as Dancer's Time, is a 1997 Russian drama film directed by Vadim Abdrashitov.

Plot 
They returned from the war. On the one hand, they won, and on the other, they lost, because they forgot how to live in peace. But the war did not destroy the most important thing in them: the will to live.

Cast 
 Andrey Egorov as Andrei Podobed
 Yuri Stepanov as Valeriy Belosheikin
 Sergey Garmash as Fiedel
 Zurab Kipshidze as Temur
 Chulpan Khamatova as Katya
 Svetlana Kopylova as Larisa, Valeriy's wife
 Vera Voronkova as Tamara
 Natalya Loskutova as Olga Pavlovna
 Sergey Nikonenko as Fyodor
 Mikhail Bogdasarov as Said

Screenings
Time of a Dancer was screened in the Stalker Human Rights Film Festival's regional presentation in Rostov-on-Don in 2010, where  Abdrashitov engaged in discussion about the film with the audience.

Awards
 Nika Award (1997):  Best Screenplay  (Aleksandr Mindadze), Best Male Supporting Role  (Zurab Kipshidze)
 Kinotavr   (1998)  Grand Prix
 Locarno Festival (1998) Special Jury Prize

References

External links 
 

1997 films
1990s Russian-language films
Russian drama films
1997 drama films
Films directed by Vadim Abdrashitov
Mosfilm films
Russian war drama films
1990s war drama films